The Jaguar R-D6 is a concept car built by the British automaker Jaguar Cars, and unveiled to the public at the 2003 Frankfurt Motor Show.

The engine was developed with Peugeot and previewed the specification prior to the launch of the Jaguar S-Type diesel.

Designed by Ian Callum, the 5-door hatchback features rear-hinged doors based on technology from the Mazda RX-8, which was part of the Ford group at the time, and a side hinged rear door. 

References

External links
Ian Callum R-D6 project page

R-D6
Cars introduced in 2003
Rear-wheel-drive vehicles
Compact cars
Hatchbacks